Chionodes lugubrella is a moth of the family Gelechiidae. The geographical distribution of this species extends throughout Europe (species not found in Ireland, Great Britain, the Benelux, the Iberian Peninsula, the Balkan Peninsula, Slovakia and Ukraine), into the Caucasus, Siberia and the Russian Far East. It is also found in North America.

The wingspan is 14–18 mm. Adults moths in Sweden are in flight from June to August.

The larvae feed on Dorycnium pentaphyllum, Trifolium repens, Vicia cracca and Lotus species.

References

External links
Lepiforum.de

Moths described in 1794
Chionodes
Moths of Europe
Moths of Asia
Moths of North America